Farid El-Ashmawi (born 29 June 1941) is an Egyptian former fencer. He competed in the team foil events at the 1960 and 1964 Summer Olympics. At the 1960 Games, he represented the United Arab Republic.

References

External links
 

1941 births
Living people
Egyptian male foil fencers
Olympic fencers of Egypt
Fencers at the 1960 Summer Olympics
Fencers at the 1964 Summer Olympics